Tebogo Joseph Langerman (born 6 May 1986) is a South African soccer player who plays as a left-back for Moroka Swallows in the Premier Soccer League and South Africa.

References

External links
 

1986 births
South African soccer players
Living people
Association football midfielders
Bidvest Wits F.C. players
SuperSport United F.C. players
Mamelodi Sundowns F.C. players
Moroka Swallows F.C. players
Association football defenders
Soccer players from Johannesburg
South Africa international soccer players
South Africa A' international soccer players
2014 African Nations Championship players